Adriana Isabel Font Molina (born 21 April 1998) is a Puerto Rican footballer who plays as a defender for Mayagüez SC and the Puerto Rico women's national team.

References

1998 births
Living people
Women's association football defenders
Puerto Rican women's footballers
Puerto Rico women's international footballers
21st-century American women